Otilovići is a village in the municipality of Pljevlja, Montenegro.

Demographics
According to the 2003 census, the village had a population of 233 people.

According to the 2011 census, its population was 245.

References

Populated places in Pljevlja Municipality